Meshir 15 - Coptic Calendar - Meshir 17

The sixteenth day of the Coptic month of Meshir, the sixth month of the Coptic year. In common years, this day corresponds to February 10, of the Julian Calendar, and February 23, of the Gregorian Calendar. This day falls in the Coptic Season of Shemu, the season of the Harvest.

Commemorations

Saints 

 The departure of Saint Elizabeth, mother of Saint John the Baptist 
 The departure of Pope Michael III, the 92nd Patriarch of the See of Saint Mark 
 The departure of Saint Micheal the Hegumen, known as el-Behairy and el-Muharraqy

References 

Days of the Coptic calendar